Dileep is an Indian actor, singer, producer, and businessman, who predominantly works in the Malayalam film industry. He has acted in more than 140 films.

Filmography

Actor

Assistant director 
 Pookkalam varavayi (1991)
 Vishnu Lokam (1991)
 Ulladakkam (1991)
 Champakulam Thachan (1992)
 Ennodishtam Koodamo (1992)
  Ghazal (1993)
Bhoomi Geetham (1993)
 Mazhayethum Munpe (1995)
  Ee Puzhayum Kadannu (1996)
 Manthramothiram (1997)

Producer

 C.I.D. Moosa (2003)
 Kadhavasheshan (2003)
 Pandippada (2005)
 Twenty:20 (2008)
 Malarvaadi Arts Club (2010)
 The Metro (2011)
 Love 24x7 (2015)
 Kattappanayile Rithwik Roshan (2017)
Keshu Ee Veedinte Nadhan (2021) 
 Thattassery Koottam (2022)
Voice of Sathyanathan (2022)
Parakkum Pappan (TBA)

Television

 Comicola (Asianet)
 Cinemala (Asianet)
 Dhe Chef (Mazhavil Manorama)
Comedy Mamankam  (Asianet)

Playback singing

References

Indian filmographies
Male actor filmographies